= Fire deficit =

Fire deficit or fire debt is the reduction in acreage burned in wildfires over a long period of time due to fire suppression, leading to fuel buildup and consequently increasing the risk of large, catastrophic wildfires.
